Kateryna Volodymyrivna Monzul (born 5 July 1981) is a Ukrainian football referee.

Biography
She took charge of her first international match in September 2005, Finland versus Poland in the 2007 FIFA Women's World Cup qualifiers. She first refereed in a final tournament at UEFA Women's Euro 2009, while at the 2011 World Cup she served as a fourth official.

The 2013 UEFA Women's Euro's Norway versus Denmark semifinal marked her first performance in a major nations tournament's final stages. The following year she refereed the 2014 UEFA Women's Champions League Final. In 2014, she was voted second in the International Federation of Football History & Statistics (IFFHS) World's Best Woman Referee poll behind Bibiana Steinhaus.

Monzul refereed the opening match of the 2015 FIFA Women's World Cup, marking her debut in the competition as main referee, in which she awarded a controversial injury time penalty kick to host nation Canada who scored to beat China 1–0. She also refereed the final on 5 July 2015 between the United States and Japan. In 2015, she was named as the IFFHS World's Best Woman Referee.

On 3 April 2016, Monzul started working in the Ukrainian Premier League, in a match between Chornomorets Odesa and Volyn Lutsk. In doing so, she became the first female referee in the elite men's Ukrainian football division.

In June 2017, Monzul was appointed to be an official at the UEFA Women's Euro 2017 in the Netherlands.

On 3 December 2018, it was announced that Monzul had been appointed to be a referee for the 2019 FIFA Women's World Cup in France. After the conclusion of the round of 16, FIFA announced that Monzul was selected as one of 11 referees who would be assigned to matches during the final 8 matches of the tournament.

In November 2020, she officiated the UEFA Nations League match between San Marino and Gibraltar as part of the first all-female refereeing team to take charge of a senior men's international.

In February 2022 Monzul fled her home country of Ukraine after the Russian invasion.

On 31 July 2022 she refereed the Women's Euro final at Wembley Stadium. The match was won by England, defeating Germany 2-1 after extra time.

International competition record
 Teams in bold progressed past the stage

Honours
 Best arbiter of Ukrainian Premier League: 2019-20

References

External links

Profile at footballzz.com
Instagram

Living people
1981 births
Ukrainian football referees
Sportspeople from Kharkiv
Kharkiv National Academy of Urban Economy alumni
FIFA Women's World Cup referees
Women association football referees
FIFA Women's World Cup Final match officials
UEFA Women's Euro 2022 referees